The Delhi Sikh Gurdwara Management Committee (DSGMC) is organization in India responsible for the management of Gurdwaras, Sikh places of worship in Delhi. It also manages various educational institutions, hospitals, old age homes, libraries and other charitable institutions in Delhi. It is headquartered in Gurdwara Rakab Ganj Sahib, near Parliament House. Currently, the president of DSGMC is Harmeet Singh Kalka.

In 1971, the government of India entrusted the management of the organization, through an ordinance, to a five-member Gurdwara Board. The ordinance was replaced by the Delhi Sikh Gurdwaras Act, 1971, passed by Parliament, providing for a committee to be elected by Sikh vote. Elections took place under the supervision of government authority and the new body called the Delhi Sikh Gurdwaras Management Committee came into existence in 1974. Under the provisions of the act, the elections must take place every four years.

Organisation
The Delhi Sikh Gurdwara Management Committee comprises 55 members, 46 of whom are elected and 9 are coopted. Out of the nine coopted members, two represent the Singh Sabhas of Delhi, one the SGPC, four the Takhts at Amritsar Sahib , Anandpur Sahib,  Patna Sahib and Nanded, and two those Sikhs of Delhi who do not want to or cannot contest elections but whose services can be of value to the committee.

The organisation is governed by a chairman and a president as per the Delhi Sikh Gurdwara Act of 1971. The term of DSGMC is four years, formed through elections conducted by the Directorate of Gurdwara Elections of the Delhi government. Of over a million Sikhs living in Delhi, around 450,000 are registered voters for the DSGMC elections.

Office bearers
In December 2021 the sitting president, Manjinder Singh Sirsa, resigned from the post. Sirsa was from Shiromani Akali Dal (SAD) when he defeated outgoing president Paramjit Singh Sarna in the elections of 2013. The current president is S. Harmeet Singh Kalka, who is representative of the Kalkaji ward and current general-secretary is S. Jagdeep Singh Kahlon, who is representative of Krishna Park ward.

Relation to the SGPC
The Delhi Sikh Gurdwara Management Committee is the counterpart of the Shiromani Gurdwara Prabandhak Committee (SGPC) in Delhi but operates independently. SGPC nominates one member to the Delhi Sikh Gurdwara Management Committee.

Educational institutes
DSGMC operates multiple educational institutions in Delhi.

Schools
 Guru Harkishan Public Schools
 Guru Nanak Public Schools

Colleges
 Sri Guru Tegh Bahadur Khalsa College
 Guru Nanak Institute of Management (GNIM)
 Guru Tegh Bahadur Institute of Technology
 Sri Guru Gobind Singh College of Commerce
 Sri Guru Nanak Dev Khalsa College
 Mata Sundri College for Women
 Guru Tegh Bahadur Polytechnic Institute
 Guru Ram Das College of Education
 Guru Nanak College of Education
 Sri Guru Tegh Bahadur Institute of Management & IT
 Guru Hargobind Institute of Management & Information Technology

Sikh Research Board 
The Sikh Research Board is a board maintained by Dsgmc. The work of this board is to do proper authentic research on sikh history and to publish rare sikh history books. The Board also works to preserve Sikh relics and historical manuscripts/scriptures.

Wall of Truth 
The Wall of Truth, a memorial for Sikhs killed during the 1984 anti-Sikh riots which also has the names of "all Sikhs killed world over in hate crimes", was built under Leadership of DSGMC President Manjit Singh GK In 2017.

See also 

 Shiromani Gurdwara Parbandhak Committee
 Haryana Sikh Gurdwara Parbandhak Committee
 Pakistan Sikh Gurdwara Prabandhak Committee

References

External links
Delhi Sikh Gurdwara Management Committee
Shiromani Gurdwara Prabhandak Committee

 
Religion in Delhi
Sikh organisations